The Juno Award for Roots & Traditional Album of the Year – Group was presented annually at Canada's Juno Awards to honour the best album of the year in the roots and/or traditional music genres. The award was first presented in 1996 under the name Best Roots & Traditional Album - Group, and adopted its current name in 2003. Prior to 1996, the Junos presented only a single award in the category, inclusive of both groups and solo artists, under the name Best Roots & Traditional Album.

Beginning with the 2016 ceremony, two new awards categories (Contemporary Roots Album of the Year and Traditional Roots Album of the Year) were introduced to "ensure two genres of music are not competing against each other in the same category".

Winners

Best Roots & Traditional Album - Group (1996 - 2002)

Roots & Traditional Album of the Year: Group (2003 - 2015)

References

Roots and Traditional - Group
Folk music awards
Album awards